GovTrack.us is a website developed by then-student Joshua Tauberer. It is based in Washington, D.C., and was launched as a hobby. It enables its users to track the bills and members of the United States Congress. Users can add trackers to certain bills, thereby narrowing the scope of the information they receive. The website collects data on members of Congress, allowing users to check members' voting records and attendance relative to their peers. It propagates the ideology of increasing transparency in the government and building better communication between the general public and the government. The website was briefly "on pause" in September 2020 in protest of President Trump's refusal to commit to a peaceful transition of power regarding the 2020 U.S. Presidential Election.

Early stages
Tauberer started govtrack.us when he was a student at Princeton University. In 2005, GovTrack was the first to make U.S. federal legislative information comprehensively available in an open, structured data format for researchers, journalists, other public interest projects, and anyone to freely reuse for any purpose. Their data was the basis for dozens of other open government projects, including major projects of the Sunlight Foundation and investigative stories at major news publications, and its data offering continued until 2017, when the U.S. Congress began publishing open, structured data itself.

Future goals

GovTrack aims to create comprehensive open data about Congress. It lobbies with Congress to make more and better legislative information available to the public.

GovTrack.us is a project of Civic Impulse, LLC, a completely independent entity which is wholly owned by its operator and receives no funding in any form from outside organizations. In the long run, it hopes to make legislation easily accessible and understandable to the general public.

Data is divided into five main subsections:
 Members of Congress
 Biographical information and committee assignments for current and former Members of Congress are from the congress-legislators project, a community repository.
 Photos are sourced from various locations, including the GPO Guide to House and Senate Members, and credited on individual legislator pages.
 Bill Status
 The status of pending legislative is retrieved daily from the U.S. Government Publishing Office (GPO) Federal Digital System (FDsys) Bill Status XML Bulk Data. Legislative activity typically appears the next business day. The site uses the open-source Congress project to automate and simplify retrieving the data.
 The ProPublica Congress API is the only public API for legislative information. The API was formerly the Sunlight Foundation Congress API and traces its history to legislative data offerings in 2010.
 Prognosis scores (predictions of enactment) are from Skopos Labs.
 Bill Summaries
 GovTrack's display several types of bill summaries. Other summaries are from the Library of Congress's Congressional Research Service (the same summaries on Congress.gov) and the House Republican Conference.
 Votes
 Roll call votes are retrieved from the Senate and House websites in XML format. The site updates its vote data roughly hourly. It uses the open-source Congress project to automate and simplify retrieving the data.
 Missed and mistaken vote explanations are from ProPublica.
 Bill Text
 The text of the legislation is retrieved from GPO.gov/FDSys in PDF, XML, and plain text formats. GovTrack uses the open-source Congress project to automate and simplify retrieving the data, congressxml to render the XML as HTML, and linkify-citations to hyperlink legal citations in bill text.

Feedback
GovTrack was cited by Clyde Haberman in The New York Times, and was mentioned as striving to help educate voters about legislation by The San Francisco Chronicle. The student wire service University Wire said the site was making it easy for people to learn about the government.

A survey conducted showed that GovTrack helped raise awareness among common citizens through their report card for each legislative year since 2013. Tauberer won a contest from Technorati for using the site to link bills to the blog posts discussing them.

References

External links 
GovTrack homepage

American political websites